The 2002 World Lacrosse Championship were held between 7–15 July 2002. The event was the ninth international men's lacrosse championship, and took place in Perth, Western Australia under the auspices of the International Lacrosse Federation. This was the second time that the tournament was held in Perth, following the 1990 tournament. Fifteen teams competed in the event in three divisions.

The United States successfully defended their title for the sixth consecutive time, defeating Canada 18–15 in the final. Australia beat the Iroquois team 12–11 for third place.

Pool Play

For the pool play phase of the tournament, the teams were divided into three divisions – five in the top Blue Division, six in the Red Division, and four in the Green Division.  The top three finishers in the Blue Division advanced directly to the semi-finals, while the fourth place team played the winner of the Red Division for the final semi-final spot. Green Division participants were not eligible to win the championship.

Blue Division

Red Division

Green Division

Championship Round
Blue Division fourth-place finisher Iroquois Nationals and Red Division winner Japan played a 1-game playoff to determine who would be the fourth and final semi-finalist in the championship bracket.

Tournament MVP Doug Shanahan dominated face-offs to give the USA a distinct advantage and an early lead. However, Canada came back to get to 7-6 on a Paul Gait goal in the second quarter and then finished strong before halftime to lead 9-7. The US team pulled ahead in the third quarter by three goals. Canada rallied again to tie the score before the US answered with three of their own to preserve a 18-15 victory.

Consolation Round

5th-8th Place

9th-12th Place
Although Ireland won the Green Division, runner-up South Korea progressed to the 9th-12th place bracket because Ireland was not yet a member of the International Lacrosse Federation.

Final standings

Source:

Awards
Best and Fairest Player: Doug Shanahan, United States.
Best Goalkeeper: Trevor Tierney, United States.
Best Defender: Ryan McClay, United States.
Best Midfielder: Doug Shanahan, United States.
Best Attackman: John Grant Jr., Canada.

All-World Team: John Grant Jr., A, Canada; Darren Lowe, A, United States; Neal Powless, A, Iroquois; Peter Inge, M, Australia; Gavin Prout, M, Canada; Doug Shanahan, M, United States; Ryan McClay, D, United States; Ryan Mollett, D, United States; Steve Toll, D, Canada; Trevor Tierney, G, United States.

See also
 Field lacrosse
 World Lacrosse, the unified governing body for world lacrosse
 World Lacrosse Championship

References

External links
 World Lacrosse
 Lacrosse World Championships 2002 (Archive of official website)

2002
2002 in lacrosse
Sports competitions in Perth, Western Australia
Lacrosse in Australia
World Lacrosse